Kopanino  is a village in the administrative district of Gmina Lubicz, within Toruń County, Kuyavian-Pomeranian Voivodeship, in north-central Poland.

In 2004 the village had a population of 180.

References

Kopanino